Anne Szumigalski, SOM (b. 3 January 1922 in London, England, d. 22 April 1999) was a Canadian poet.

Life 
She was born Anne Howard Davis in London, England, and grew up mostly in a Hampshire village. She served with the Red Cross as a medical auxiliary officer and interpreter during World War II, following British Army forces in 1944-5 across parts of newly liberated Europe.  In 1946, she married Jan Szumigalski, (d. 1985) a former officer in the Polish Army, and lived with him in north Wales before immigrating to Canada in 1951.  They had four children: Kate (born 1946), Elizabeth (1947), Tony (1961) and Mark (1963).  She spent the rest of her life in Saskatchewan, first in the remote Big Muddy valley, then in Saskatoon.

Writing career 
Most of her fifteen books are collections of poetry, but she also wrote a memoir, The Voice, the Word, the Text (1990) as well as Z., a play about the Holocaust.  Her first book, Woman Reading in Bath (1974), was published by Doubleday in New York. Thereafter she made the deliberate choice to publish her work with Canadian presses.  She helped found the Saskatchewan Writers Guild and the literary journal Grain, and served as a mentor to many younger writers.

Szumigalski combined a love of the Canadian Prairies with a passion for language, a faith in poetry and an intimate knowledge of literary tradition.  She was a great admirer of William Blake, some of whose visionary qualities appear in her own work.

Her finest work is collected in a big volume of selected poems, On Glassy Wings (Coteau, 1997). In 2006 her literary executor Mark Abley edited a volume of her posthumous poems, When Earth Leaps Up. A final posthumous book is expected in 2010.

The Manitoba Writers Guild has set up a scholarship in her name. The Saskatchewan Book Award for Poetry is named for her. Her papers are held at the University of Regina, and University of Saskatchewan.

Awards 
In 1989, she was awarded the Saskatchewan Order of Merit.  Her 1995 collection Voice, featuring paintings by Marie Elyse St. George, won the Governor General's Award for English language poetry. She also received many other honours over the years.

Works

Memoirs 
 A Woman Clothed in Words, (forthcoming from Coteau in 2010). 
 The word, the voice, the text: the life of a writer. Saskatoon: Fifth House, 1990

Plays
 Z, Coteau Books, 1995 , (a play about the Holocaust).

Poetry 
 A Peeled Wand: Selected Poems of Anne Szumigalski Winnipeg: Signature Editions, 2011.  (posthumous poems)
 When Earth Leaps Up. London: Brick Books, 2006.  (posthumous poems)
 Sermons on stones: words and images. Saskatoon: Hagios Press, 1997. 
 On glassy wings: poems new & selected. Regina: Coteau Books, 1997. 
 Voice. with Marie Elyse St. George. Regina: Coteau Books, 1995. 
 Why couldn't you see blue? Caroline Heath. edited by Anne Szumigalski. Regina: Coteau Books, 1994. 
 Rapture of the deep. paintings by G.N. Louise Jonasson. Regina: Coteau Books, 1991. 
 Journey/journée. with Terrence Heath and drawings and wood engravings by Jim Westergard. Red Deer, Alta.: Red Deer College Press, 1988. 
 Dogstones: selected and new poems. Saskatoon: Fifth House, 1986. 
 Heading out: the new Saskatchewan poets. edited by Don Kerr and Anne Szumigalski. Coteau Books, 
 Jaw, Sask.: Coteau Books, 1986. 
 Instar: poems and stories. Red Deer, Alta.: RDC Press, 1985. 
 Risks: a poem. illustrations by Jim Westergard. Red Deer, Alta.: RDC Press, 1983. 
 Doctrine of signatures. Saskatoon: Fifth House, 1983. 
 A game of angels. Winnipeg: Turnstone Press, 1980. 
 Wild man's butte: a stereophonic poem. with Terrence Heath. Moose Jaw, Sask.: Coteau Books, 1979. 
 Thunder Creek Pub. Co-operative, 1979. 
 Woman reading in bath: poems. Toronto: Doubleday Canada; Garden City, N.Y.: Doubleday, 1974.

References

External links
 Grain
 Anne Szumigalski at The Canadian Encyclopedia
 Anne Szumigalski, Saskatchewan Publishers Group
 Anne Szumigalski, Poetry Project, Atwater Library, February 15, 2007
 Anne Szumigalski Collection, Mark Abley, University of Saskatchewan

1922 births
1999 deaths
20th-century Canadian poets
Canadian women poets
English emigrants to Canada
Members of the Saskatchewan Order of Merit
Writers from Hampshire
Governor General's Award-winning poets
Writers from London
20th-century Canadian women writers